George Fitch may refer to:

George Ashmore Fitch (1883–1979), American missionary to China
George B. Fitch (1948–2014), American businessman and politician
George Fitch (author) (1877–1915), American humorist
George Fitch (Wisconsin politician) (1848–1896), member of the Wisconsin Senate